Ernst August Dircksen (31 May 1831 in Danzig – 11 May 1899 in Erfurt) was a German architect.

Life 
Ernst Dircksen studied at the Berlin Bauakademie. In 1867, he relocated to Upper Silesia and soon became an expert for building railway bridges and railway lines. In 1882, Dircksen was sent to Cologne to redesign and expand the railway lines there; in 1890 he relocated to Erfurt.

In 1902, a memorial for Dircksen, made by Ludwig Brunow, was erected near the station Friedrichstraße in Berlin. The memorial was later destroyed.

Works 
 Bridge at Dirschau across the Weichsel
 Bridge over the Rhine in Cologne
 Station in Frankfurt (Oder)
 Berlin Ringbahn
 Rail line from Remilly to Pont-à-Mousson
 Railway lines for the Bergisch-Märkische Eisenbahn Gesellschaft
 Planning and site management for the Berlin Stadtbahn
 Multiple railway lines in the Cologne area
 New lines around Erfurt

References 

1831 births
1899 deaths
German civil engineers
Engineers from Gdańsk
People from the Province of Prussia
German people in rail transport
19th-century German architects